Cristiano Michael Fitzgerald (born 10 November 2003) is a professional footballer currently playing as a forward for Portuguese club Boavista. Born in Singapore, he represents the Republic of Ireland at youth international level.

Early life
Born in Singapore to an Irish father from Limerick and French mother, Fitzgerald was named after then-Manchester United player Cristiano Ronaldo. His father had been watching the 2003–04 Premier League season opener against Bolton Wanderers, in which Ronaldo made his debut, and decided upon the name for his son. He moved to London shortly after his first birthday, before spending seven years in San Diego, California.

Club career
He returned to Singapore, joining a local football team who would routinely tour Europe, playing in Spain, Sweden and Portugal. His family moved again in 2017, this time to Porto, Portugal, and shortly after, he joined the academy of Boavista. He also spent some time back in the United States due to his father's work, playing for the De Anza Force. He returned to Boavista in 2020, and a year later, he was clocked as one of the fastest players in world football. He went on trial with Scottish club Dundee United in July 2022, but this amounted to nothing.

In September 2022, he signed his first professional contract with Boavista. Only three months later, he signed a new deal, a four-year contract. He made his unofficial debut for the club in a friendly match against French side Bordeaux on 16 December 2022.

International career
Fitzgerald is eligible to represent the Republic of Ireland and France through his parents, Singapore through birth, and Portugal, having lived there since 2017. He has expressed his desire to represent the Republic of Ireland. In 2021, he made his first appearance for the Republic of Ireland at under-19 level.

Personal life
Fitzgerald's father, Jimmy, was a youth hurling player for the Limerick county hurling team in Ireland, and his brothers, Dean and Julian, play for Leça and Boavista's youth teams, respectfully.

References

2003 births
Living people
Irish people of French descent
Republic of Ireland association footballers
Republic of Ireland youth international footballers
French footballers
Singaporean footballers
Association football forwards
Boavista F.C. players
Republic of Ireland expatriate association footballers
Irish expatriate sportspeople in the United States
Expatriate soccer players in the United States
Irish expatriate sportspeople in Portugal
Expatriate footballers in Portugal
De Anza Force players